Eucalyptus acmenoides, commonly known as white mahogany or barayly, is a tree that is endemic to eastern Australia. It is a large tree with grey to reddish brown, stringy bark, lance-shaped leaves, oval to spindle-shaped buds and more or less hemispherical fruits. The two sides of adult leaves are very different shades of green.

Description 
It has thin stringy or fibrous, grey to reddish brown bark. The operculum is conical or beak-shaped, about as long and wide as the flower cup.

Taxonomy
Eucalyptus acmenoides was first formally described in 1843 by Johannes Conrad Schauer from a specimen collected by Allan Cunningham in a forest in New South Wales in January 1817. The description was published in Wilhelm Gerhard Walpers' book Repertorium Botanices Systematicae (Volume 2). The specific epithet (acmenoides) refers to a similarity to plants in the genus Acmena.

This tree is sometimes referred to as the yellow stringybark in parts of Queensland, however, despite the rough and somewhat stringy bark, this tree is considered to be in the mahogany group of eucalyptus.

Eucalyptus acmenoides is part of the white mahogany group as recognised by Ken Hill. The others in the group are E. mediocris, E. apothalassica, E. carnea, E. helidonica, E. latisinensis, E. psammitica and E. umbra.

Distribution and habitat 
White mahogany grows in wet forest and woodland, in deeper soils with reliable moisture and is found between areas near the Atherton Tableland in Queensland and south to Port Jackson.

Timber 
White mahogany is well regarded for the high quality of timber. The timber has various uses, including heavy engineering, poles, railway sleepers, bridge and wharf construction, framing, decking stumps, fence posts, joists, flooring, plates and weatherboarding.

The sapwood is usually not attacked by the lyctus borer. Heartwood is light, of a pale yellowish brown. The texture is medium and even. Grain structure is uniform, however at times it can be interlocked.

Timber somewhat similar to the tallowwood, but not quite as greasy. Wood resistant to termites. Timber is hard, heavy, strong, tough and durable. Around 1000 kilograms per cubic metre.

References 

 http://www.timber.net.au/?option=com_species&name=White%20Mahogany&Itemid=469

acmenoides
Myrtales of Australia
Flora of New South Wales
Flora of Queensland
Plants described in 1843
Taxa named by Johannes Conrad Schauer